Raspopov (from распоп meaning defrocked priest) a Russian masculine surname, its feminine counterpart is Raspopova. It may refer to:

Andriy Raspopov (born 1978), Ukrainian football player
Vladimir Raspopov (1927–1999), Soviet equestrian

See also
Raspopović, Serbian

Russian-language surnames